Sumampattus is a genus of South American jumping spiders that was first described by María Elena Galiano in 1983.  it contains only three species, found in Brazil, Peru, Argentina, Uruguay, and Paraguay: S. hudsoni, S. pantherinus, and S. quinqueradiatus. The name is a combination of Sumampa, a Department of Argentina, and the common ending for salticid genera -attus.

References

Salticidae genera
Salticidae
Spiders of South America